Georges Boireau was a French boxer. He competed in the men's featherweight event at the 1928 Summer Olympics.

References

External links

Year of birth missing
Possibly living people
French male boxers
Olympic boxers of France
Boxers at the 1928 Summer Olympics
Place of birth missing
Featherweight boxers